The Pagan Federation is a UK-based voluntary organisation, founded as the Pagan Front, that provides information and counters misconceptions about Neopaganism. It was formed in 1971, and campaigns for the religious rights of Neo-pagans and educates both civic bodies and the general public about Paganism. Pagan Federation is a constituted voluntary organisation, registered as a private Company limited by guarantee, with exemption for use of 'limited' with Companies House on 22 August 2000, with its nature listed as a Religious Organisation. The memorandum of the association lists the objects of the Pagan Federation as providing services for Pagans in the UK and abroad, providing information about Paganism to the public and all interested bodies, educating the public about Pagan beliefs and traditions, providing access to Pagan celebrations, and providing pastoral care for Pagans in the community including those in hospitals and prisons.

The Pagan Federation publishes a quarterly magazine, Pagan Dawn, that features articles, reviews, and research on both modern and historic Paganism.

Beliefs of the Pagan Federation 
The Pagan Federation believes that 'Paganism is the ancestral religion of the whole of humanity', according to Cole Morton who was awarded the 'Pagan Federation National Journalist of the Year' in 2010.  Pagan Federation states that for someone to be Pagan, they need only believe in the following:
 Each person has a right to follow his or her own path, as long as it harms no one.  
 There is a higher power (or powers), 
 Nature is to be venerated

Aims of the Pagan Federation 
 The Pagan Federation aims to represent all "followers of a Polytheistic or Pantheistic nature-worshipping religion" and has a membership that includes Druids as well as Wiccans, practising modern Witchcraft; Shamans, engaging with the spirits of the land; and Heathens, worshipping the Gods of the North European tribes.
The Aim of the PF translates as the following core activities,
 Promotion of contact between Pagan groups and genuine seekers of the Old Ways. 
 Promotion of contact and dialogue between the various branches of European Paganism and other Pagan organisations worldwide. 
 Provision of practical and effective information on Paganism to members of the public, media, public bodies, and the Administration.

According to the Pagan Federation Wessex website, the Pagan Federation "seeks to support all Pagans to ensure they have the same rights as the followers of other beliefs and religions. It aims to promote a positive profile for Pagans and Paganism and to provide information on Pagan beliefs to the media, official bodies and the greater community."

It is active throughout Europe and organises a large number of Pagan events. The organisation produces the magazine, Pagan Dawn which is the Pagan Federation's journal. In 2001, it successfully fought for the reinstatement of its first Youth Manager, Dr Ralph Morse, whose association with the organisation was considered sufficient grounds for his sacking as Head of Drama, Media and Theatre Arts at Shenfield High School in Essex.

There are many different regional bodies each organising its own events and functioning on a local basis In addition, Scotland has its own national Pagan Federation which carries out the work of the PF in that country.

Pagan Federation in the media 
 Epping Forest Guardian  reported on 24 July 2012 that an anonymous leaflet stuffed through letterboxes on Epping High Street on Monday (23 July) warns of a Pagan 'plan to abduct a male member of the public for use as part of their rituals'. This claim was dismissed by a representative of the Pagan Federation. The Representative stated that the Pagan Federation works with the Government to create guidelines on recognising Paganism.
 BBC online article on PF  The Pagan Federation as saying that Pagans want the same recognition as other faiths, and that druids, Wiccans, witches and other pagans constitute a serious and growing religious group.

Campaigns of the Pagan Federation 
The BBC reported on 27 February 2011, that according to the 2001 Census, 42,000 people declared themselves as Pagans - the seventh highest number for any UK religion - but some experts believe the true figure was nearer 250,000  - and is significantly higher now. For the 2011 Census, The Pagan Federation was asking all Pagans to put aside their reservations and to put 'Pagan' in the box for religion. This is so that a truer value of the number of pagans in the UK could be determined. The ONS reported that 56,620 people identified themselves as Pagan in the 2011 census, the eighth highest for a UK religion.

See also 
Neopaganism in the United Kingdom

References

External links 
The Pagan Federation main website
The Pagan Federation International website
The Scottish Pagan Federation website
 Pagan Federation London website
PF Wessex website
 Guardian G2 Sunday feature `Everyone's a Pagan Now' by Cole Morton
 BBC News `Pagans Campaign for Census Voice'
Epping Forest Guardian "Pagns deny "ridiculous" claims of Lammas Day abduction plan"

Religious organizations established in 1971
Modern pagan organisations based in the United Kingdom
1971 establishments in the United Kingdom
Modern pagan organizations established in the 1970s